WKID 96.7 FM was an unlicensed low-power FM radio station in Clearwater, Florida, United States, operating under the authority of Title 47 CFR Part 15.  It was described as "the world's only kid-owned and operated FM radio station".

History

WKID 96.7 FM started as a Christmas present in 2004 to Adam "A-Dawg" from his father, who built an FM transmitter kit for A-Dawg. Nightly on-air content included new stories picked out by the starting crew of Adam "A-Dawg" (owner) and his family and friends. At the time, they were only able to transmit throughout the community.

Two years later, the setup was enlarged, and Spacial Audio became a sponsor of the station.  The station grew to be about 25 kids strong.

With media attention from local media outlets such as the St. Petersburg Times, WTSP, WTVT, and Bay News 9, they were able to get listeners in during their nightly shows in the thousands and tens of thousands. The DJs made public appearances for charities.

As of June 2022, WKID's stream is no longer running, and the website has not been updated since 2004; it is unknown when the station ceased operations.

References

External links 
Official website

KID
Radio stations established in 2004
Radio stations disestablished in 2022
Clearwater, Florida
Unlicensed radio stations in the United States
2004 establishments in Florida
2022 disestablishments in Florida
Defunct radio stations in the United States
KID